Delias toxopei is a butterfly in the family Pieridae. It was described by Roepke in 1955. It is found in New Guinea.

The wingspan is about 58–65 mm. Adults are similar to Delias eichhorni, but can be distinguished by the greater amount of black on the upper wings.

Subspecies
D. t. toxopei (Baliem Valley, Ibele River, Irian Jaya)
D. t. morosa Roepke, 1955 (Aruba River (Paniai Lakes) and Weyland Mountains, Irian Jaya)
D. t. uranoi Yagishita, 1993 (Mulia Central Mountains, Irian Jaya)
D. t. nipsan Mastrigt, 1995 (Nipsan, Irian Jaya)

References

External links
Delias at Markku Savela's Lepidoptera and Some Other Life Forms

toxopei
Butterflies described in 1955